Venezuelan Democratic Party (PDV) was a political party in Venezuela. It was created in September 1943 by President Isaías Medina Angarita to organize supporters of his government. Its dominant role in the political system ended with Rómulo Betancourt's 1945 coup.

Defunct political parties in Venezuela
Political parties established in 1943
1943 establishments in Venezuela